The 2020 MOTUL 100% Synthetic Grand Prix was a sports car race sanctioned by the International Motor Sports Association (IMSA). The race was held at the Charlotte Motor Speedway ROVAL in Concord, North Carolina on October 10th, 2020. This race was the eighth round of the 2020 WeatherTech SportsCar Championship, and the sixth round of the 2020 WeatherTech Sprint Cup.

The overall race was won by the #3 team of Jordan Taylor and Antonio García, the duo's fifth of the season. The Turner Motorsport team of Robby Foley and Bill Auberlen took victory in the GTD class, their second win of the season.

Background
The race replaced the Northeast Grand Prix at Lime Rock Park due to travel issues regarding the COVID-19 pandemic in Connecticut, meaning the race would be run as part of a triple-header weekend and a double-header Saturday evening with the NASCAR Cup and NASCAR Xfinity Series. The race was the shortest of the 2020 season, as the race was scheduled for the length of the Detroit and Long Beach rounds that had been cancelled because of the pandemic as two-hour races (1 hour, 40 minutes) in length, and was one of two events that included only entries from the GTLM and GTD classes (as it was moved from Lime Rock). The race also marked the first time since 2000 that an IMSA series raced at Charlotte Motor Speedway. In late September, Motul was announced as the primary sponsor of the event.

On October 2, 2020, IMSA released the latest technical bulletin regarding the Balance of Performance for the race. In the GTLM class, the Porsche 911 received a 15 kilogram weight reduction, while no other changes were made to other cars in the class. In GTD, the Ferrari 488 received a 6.7 horsepower increase, a 5 kilogram increase in minimum weight, and a one-liter increase in fuel capacity.

Entries

A total of 18 cars took part in the event, the lowest number of entries that season, but because the two prototype classes were not scheduled to participate in this event, there were more cars between the two participating classes for this race than the previous round at Mid-Ohio. There were six cars in the GTLM class, two more than at Mid-Ohio, when the CORE Autosport-run Porsche GT Team skipped the previous round due to novel coronavirus concerns within the Porsche factory camp following the 24 Heures du Mans, and twelve cars in the GTD class, the same as the preceding event.  Jeff Kingsley made his series debut in the Compass McLaren. Despite the BoP break, Scuderia Corsa missed their second consecutive event, with driver Cooper MacNeil focusing on a championship in the Ferrari Challenge. Frankie Montecalvo was replaced in the #12 AIM Vasser Sullivan entry by Michael De Quesada, as the former was getting married (originally, this race was to have been held at Lime Rock Park on July 17-18, and later rescheduled to October 30-31 before being moved to Charlotte where promoters moved the dates to be part of the NASCAR weekend after state authorities rejected the event over travel restrictions).

Qualifying
Both qualifying sessions demonstrated the drivers' lack of familiarity with the circuit. Laurens Vanthoor broke his Porsche's rear suspension in an accident at turn 7 that drew a red flag. As the session came to a close, Jesse Krohn knocked the mirror off his BMW in turn 1. GTD pole-winner Aaron Telitz suffered minor contact with the outside wall coming out of the final chicane, Kingsley and Rob Ferriol made contact coming into said chicane, and the GTD session's red flag came after Mikhail Goikhberg hit the wall at turn 7 and was unable to get his car going again.

Qualifying results

Results

References

External links
IMSA Race Resource Guide

MOTUL 100% Synthetic Grand Prix
MOTUL 100% Synthetic Grand Prix
MOTUL 100% Synthetic Grand Prix